Rasool Pur (also spelled as Rasoolpur); is a village located in Thari Mirwah.

See also
 Hindyari
 Khairpur (princely state)
 Sajjad Shar

References

Populated places in Khairpur District
Thari Mirwah